Otuke is a town in Otuke District, Lango sub-region, in Northern Uganda. It is the chief municipal, administrative and commercial center of the district and the district headquarters are located in the town. The district is named after the town.

Location
The coordinates of Otuke are:2°26'39.0"N, 33°30'10.0"E (Latitude:2.444175; Longitude:33.502766).

Population
The population of the town of Otuke is not known, as of June 2014.

Points of interest
The following points of interest lie within the town limits and close to the edges of town:
 The headquarters of Otuke District Administration
 The offices of Otuke Town Council
 Otuke Central Market
 Orum Health Centre IV

See also
Otuke District
Lango sub-region
Northern Uganda

References

External links
  Otuke Town Clerk in Trouble over shillings 18 Million

Populated places in Northern Region, Uganda
Cities in the Great Rift Valley
Otuke District
Lango sub-region